Volovsky District is the name of several administrative and municipal districts in Russia.
Volovsky District, Lipetsk Oblast, an administrative and municipal district of Lipetsk Oblast
Volovsky District, Tula Oblast, an administrative and municipal district of Tula Oblast

References